Utel may refer to:

Utel (telecommunications), Ukrainian mobile phone operator
Utel (bishop), Bishop of Hereford who lived in the 8th century